Operation Iron Hammer was a joint operation between the US Army, US Air Force and Iraqi Civil Defense Corps with the objective of preventing the staging of weapons by anti-coalition forces, and preemptively destroy enemy operating bases and fighters in Baghdad.

Launch
The operation was launched on the night of 12 November 2003 by elements of the US Army's 1st Armored Division who performed cordon-and-search actions in several Baghdad neighborhoods. The operation's first salvo came when 1st Armored Division soldiers saw mortar rounds being fired from a van and gave chase, noting stops it made. An AH-64 Apache helicopter followed the van and attacked it, killing two suspected anti-coalition fighters and wounding three others. Five others were captured. Soldiers found an 82 mm mortar launch tube at one of the van's stops.

Strikes
In Operation Iron Hammer the military began preemptively destroying buildings suspected to be bases of operations for anti-coalition forces. The buildings included the former Republican Guard building, in the western part of the capital near Baghdad International Airport, and a warehouse in southern Baghdad. Both buildings had been used to conduct attacks on U.S. troops and were destroyed by AC-130 Spectre gunships and M2 Bradley fighting vehicles. U.S. forces also fired artillery rounds at two suspected mortar and rocket launch sites, one in western Baghdad and one in eastern Baghdad.

Conclusion
At the conclusion of Operation Iron Hammer Coalition forces has conducted 609 patrols in and around Baghdad capturing 33 enemy personnel. Combat actions included two cordon-and-search operations in Baghdad, detaining six people with suspected ties to the Fedayeen Saddam paramilitary organization and other anti-coalition elements. Another cordon-and-search operation in Baghdad's Azamiyah section netted 25 enemy personnel, including a former Republican Guard general, and significant quantities of weapons and ammunition. A joint cordon-and-search operation was also conducted in the Abu Ghuraib area with the Iraqi Civil Defense Corps.

Military Units Involved
US forces reported to be involved were
1st Armored Division
USS Enterprise (CVN 65)

Iraqi forces reported to be involved were
Iraqi Civil Defense Corps

Casualties
No casualty figures are available. Please see Wikipage "Casualties of Iraq War" for information on casualty figures for the war in general.

Next Operations

Followed Operation OK Corral, followed by Operation Eagle Curtain.

References

Military operations of the Iraq War involving the United States
Military operations of the Iraq War in 2003